Kirby Lee Spurlock (April 7, 1893 – July 12, 1977) was a college football player. He was a prominent guard for the Mississippi A&M Aggies from 1913 to 1916, captain of the 1916 team. He was selected All-Southern in 1914 and 1915.

References

1893 births
1977 deaths
All-Southern college football players
Mississippi State Bulldogs football players
American football guards
People from Amite County, Mississippi
Players of American football from Mississippi